New Coochbehar junction railway station is the main railway station in the district of Cooch Behar. It serves Cooch Behar city in Cooch Behar district in the Indian state of West Bengal. It lies under Alipurduar railway division.

It is a Junction station on the New Jalpaiguri–New Bongaigaon section of the Barauni–Guwahati line, New Mal–Changrabandha–New Cooch Behar line and Alipurduar–Bamanhat branch line of Northeast Frontier Railway.

History
Cooch Behar had its first railway when Cooch Behar State Railway constructed the narrow gauge Geetaldaha-Jainti line in 1901. It was subsequently on the metre gauge Alipurduar-Bamanhat-Golokganj line.  When Assam Link Project constructed the link through North Bengal, it used the longer New Jalpaiguri–Alipurduar–Samuktala Road line.

New Cooch Behar station came up when the broad gauge New Jalpaiguri–New Bongaigaon section of Barauni–Guwahati line was laid in 1966.

There were two stations Pateswari and Sonahat which were in Bangladesh, these functioned even after partition. However, the collapse of the rail-cum-road bridge over the Gadadhar in the seventies ended that link. Now the bridge has been rebuilt and a new broad-gauge track has been laid, under New Maynaguri-Jogighopa Rail Project, via Tufangunj and Boxirhat, entirely through Indian territory. Dhubri-New Jalpaiguri Inter-city Express via Cooch Behar was introduced in February 2012. A new railway link from New Cooch Behar to New Jalpaiguri via Mathabhanga opened shortly.

Facilities 

The entire compound of New Cooch Behar Railway Station is equipped with free high-speed Wi-Fi services provided by RailTel. New facilities include a Food Lounge, Children area, Air-Conditioned Dormitory and an Air-Conditioned Upper Class Waiting Hall.

To increase mobility among passengers especially physically challenged Persons, elevators have been installed in Platform 1, 2, 3 and 4. An escalator has also been installed in Platform 1.

Toilets are now equipped with modern sanitary fittings and have exclusive facilities for male, female and physically challenged. There are numerous Pay-and-Use Toilets in the station. Special Waiting halls for ladies have also been built.

IRCTC offers online booking of Dormitory rooms and also allows online food ordering. There are over bridges connecting the different platforms. There are displays all over the railway station and numerous food and magazine vendors in every platform.

Electrification

Northern Frontier Railways has made a significant achievement in providing a pollution-free green mode of transport as electrification of total  of track has been completed during the financial year 2020–21, despite the COVID-19 epidemic, railway electrification work in various sections of the North Frontier Railway was being done rapidly. The Electrification was inspected by the Commissioner of Railway Safety of Northern Frontier Railways. Test runs have been conducted in early 2021. As of September 2021, the station is fully electrified and awaits electric train service.

Major Trains
 Dibrugarh - New Delhi Rajdhani Express (Via New Tinsukia)
 Dibrugarh - New Delhi Rajdhani Express (Via Moranhat)
 Dibrugarh - New Delhi Rajdhani Express (Via Rangapara North)
Agartala - Sir M. Visvesvaraya Terminal Humsafar Express
Naharlagun - New Delhi AC Superfast Express
Kamakhya - Lokmanya Tilak Terminus AC Superfast Express
Kamakhya - Sir M. Visvesvaraya Terminal AC Superfast Express
Guwahati - New Delhi Poorvattar Sampark Kranti Superfast Express
Silchar–New Delhi Poorvottar Sampark Kranti Superfast Express
Silchar - Thiruvananthapuram Aronai Superfast Express
Silchar - Coimbatore Superfast Express
Silchar - Sealdah Kanchanjunga Express
Dibrugarh–Kanyakumari Vivek Express
Dibrugarh– Chennai Tambaram Express
Dibrugarh–Amritsar Express
Dibrugarh–Chandigarh Express
Dibrugarh - Lokmanya Tilak Terminus Superfast Express
Dibrugarh-Lalgarh Avadh Assam Express
Dibrugarh–Kolkata Superfast Express
Dibrugarh-Howrah Kamrup Express via Guwahati
Dibrugarh–Howrah Kamrup Express Via Rangapara North
Silghat Town - Tambaram Nagaon Express
Silghat Town - Kolkata Kaziranga Express
Agartala - Firozpur Tripura Sundari Express
Agartala - Deoghar Weekly Express
Agartala - Sealdah Kanchanjunga Express
New Tinsukia–Bengaluru Weekly Express
New Tinsukia–Rajendra Nagar Weekly Express
New Tinsukia - Darbhanga Jivachh Link Express
Guwahati - Jammu Tawi Lohit Express
Guwahati- Sir M. Visvesvaraya Terminal Kaziranga Superfast Express
Guwahati - Bikaner Express
Guwahati - Okha Dwarka Express
Guwahati - Barmer Express
Guwahati–Secunderabad Express
Guwahati-Jammu Tawi Amarnath Express
Guwahati - Lokmanya Tilak Terminus Express
Guwahati-Howrah Saraighat Superfast Express
Guwahati - Kolkata Garib Rath Express
Kamakhya–Shri Mata Vaishno Devi Katra Express
Kamakhya–Gandhidham Superfast Express
Kamakhya - Jodhpur, Bhagat Ki Kothi Express
Kamakhya - Delhi Brahmaputra Mail
Kamakhya - Puri Express (via Adra)
Kamakhya–Gaya Express
Kamakhya - Delhi Northeast Express
New Alipurduar - Sealdah Padatik Superfast Express
Silchar-Trivandrum Superfast Express
Bamanhat - Sealdah Uttar Banga Express
New Jalpaiguri - Bongaigaon Express
New Alipurdiar - Sealdah Teesta Torsha Express

References

Railway junction stations in West Bengal
Railway stations in Cooch Behar district
Alipurduar railway division
Railway stations opened in 1966
Transport in Cooch Behar